Suzanne Scotchmer (January 23, 1950 – January 30, 2014) was an American professor of law, economics and public policy at the University of California, Berkeley and also a noted author on many economic subjects. She earned her B.A. from University of Washington magna cum laude in 1970, her M.A. in statistics from UC Berkeley in 1979, and her PhD in economics from UC Berkeley in 1980.

Biography
Scotchmer was raised in Pelican, Alaska, where her grandparents homesteaded after failing as gold rushers.

Scotchmer held visiting and teaching positions at Harvard University, University of Auckland, Cergy-Pontoise University, Tel Aviv University, Pantheon-Sorbonne University, the University of Toronto Law School, University of Southern California, New School of Economics, Moscow, and the Stockholm School of Economics. She also has held research fellowships at Yale University and Stanford University. She also served on editorial boards of American Economic Review, Journal of Economic Literature, Journal of Economic Perspectives, Regional Science and Urban Economics, and the Journal of Public Economics. Scotchmer served on various committees of the National Research Council and was a member of the Board on Science, Technology, and Economic Policy. The Department of Justice used her as a consultant on antitrust. She was a fellow of the Econometrics Society.

She was most renowned for her contributions on economic literature on subjects ranging from intellectual property and innovation to game theory. She was considered one of the leading and most prominent experts on patent law and incentives for R&D and game theory. Her pieces were cited several times on work in the subject. She served as a scholar in residence at the US appellate court and has been called to testify as an expert in patent matters.

In 2017 The Econometric Society published a book recalling her life and work with a collection of 11 of her best-known papers.

Death
Scotchmer died on January 30, 2014, one week after her 64th birthday, following a brief bout with intestinal cancer.

Research
Picking Winners in Rounds of Elimination; 2012	
Ideas and Innovations: Which Should Be Subsidized?; 2011	
Verifiability and Group Formation in Markets; 2010	
Risk Taking and Gender in Hierarchies; 2010	
Cap-and-Trade, Emissions Taxes, and Innovation; 2010	
Openness, Open Source, and the Veil of Ignorance; 2010	
Scarcity of Ideas and R&D Options: Use it, Lose it or Bank it; 2009	
Profit Neutrality in Licensing: The Boundary Between Antitrust Law and Patent Law; 2008	
Digital Rights Management and the Pricing of Digital Products; 2006	
Still Looking for Lost Profits: The Case of Horizontal Competition; 2006	
Open Source Software: The New Intellectual Property Paradigm; 2006	
Innovation and Incentives (book); 2004.
Intellectual Property; 2005	
The Political Economy of Intellectual Property Treaties; 2004
Procuring Knowledge; 2003	
The Core and Hedonic Core: Reply to Wooders (2001), with Counterexamples; 2003	
Damages and Injunctions in the Protection of Proprietary Research Tools; 2000	
The Independent-Invention Defense in Intellectual Property; 1999	
On the Optimality of the Patent Renewal System; 1999	
Patent Breadth, Patent Life, and the Pace of Technological Progress; 1999	
Protecting Early Innovators: Should Second-Generation Products be Patentable?; 1998

References

External links

1950 births
2014 deaths
Economists from Alaska
21st-century American economists
20th-century American economists
Deaths from cancer in California
Deaths from colorectal cancer
Academic staff of the Stockholm School of Economics
University of California, Berkeley alumni
University of California, Berkeley faculty
University of Washington alumni
American women economists
Fellows of the Econometric Society
American women academics
Game theorists
20th-century American women
21st-century American women